Mount Steller is a stratovolcano in Katmai National Park in Alaska, United States. It is part of the Aleutian Range and is located on the Alaska Peninsula.

The mountain was presumably named for the naturalist Georg Wilhelm Steller. While evidence is uncertain, the volcano is believed to have erupted during the Holocene epoch.

References

External links
 Mount Steller on Topozone (Note that the mountain name is misspelled "Stellar" on this map.)

Volcanoes of Lake and Peninsula Borough, Alaska
Mountains of Lake and Peninsula Borough, Alaska
Mountains of Alaska
Volcanoes of Alaska
Stratovolcanoes of the United States
Aleutian Range